Snowbound is a 1927 American silent comedy film produced and released by Tiffany Pictures and directed by Phil Goldstone. It stars Robert Agnew, Betty Blythe and Harold Goodwin. A copy of Snowbound is preserved at the Library of Congress.

Cast
Betty Blythe as Julia Barry
Lillian Rich as Alice Blake
Robert Agnew as Robert Foley
George Fawcett as Uncle Tim Foley
Martha Mattox as Aunt Amelia Foley
Harold Goodwin as Joe Baird
Guinn "Big Boy" Williams as Bull Morgan (credited as Guinn Williams)
Pat Harmon as Mr. Parker
William A. Carroll as Judge Watkins
Dorothea Wolbert as Maid

References

External links

Lobby poster(Wayback Machine)

1927 films
American silent feature films
Tiffany Pictures films
1927 comedy films
Silent American comedy films
American black-and-white films
Films directed by Phil Goldstone
1920s American films